Rupert Charles is a given name. Notable people with the name include:

 Rupert Charles Barneby (1911–2000), British-born self-taught botanist
 Rupert Charles Hart-Davis (1907–1999), British publisher, literary editor, and man of letters

Compound given names